St Mary's College in New Oscott, Birmingham, often called Oscott College, is the Roman Catholic seminary of the Archdiocese of Birmingham in England and one of the three seminaries of the Catholic Church in England and Wales.

Purpose

Oscott College admits students for the priesthood from various dioceses of England and Wales, as well as some students from overseas. The first three years of the academic programme are validated by the University of Birmingham as a BA in Fundamental Catholic Theology. Those who complete the six-year programme also obtain a Bachelor of Sacred Theology (STB) through affiliation with the Katholieke Universiteit Leuven.

Oscott College is also a centre for the formation of candidates for the permanent diaconate.

History

Old Oscott
The college was founded in Oscott, in present-day Great Barr, in 1794 for both the training of priests and the education of lay pupils. It developed out of a small mission founded by Fr Andrew Bromwich around 1687.

New Oscott

In 1838, the college moved to a new site, which came to be known as New Oscott (and the original site as "Old Oscott"). The Maryvale Institute remains on the original site. The new building was designed by Augustus Pugin and Joseph Potter at a cost of £40,000. It is grade II* listed. The college quickly became a symbol of the rebirth of the Catholic faith in England and played a prominent part in the life of the Church in the 19th century. In 1889, the college was closed, but reopened the following year as a seminary only.

21st Century
After the closure of St Cuthbert's College, Ushaw, Durham, in 2011, many of the dioceses in the province of Liverpool sent their students to Oscott to complete their training. This gave a boost in numbers at the college at a time when vocations seemed to be scarce.

Pope Benedict XVI visited on 19 September 2010 following the beatification, earlier that day in Birmingham's Cofton Park, of Cardinal Newman who stayed at the college in the late 1840s. During his visit to Oscott, Benedict met and had lunch with the Roman Catholic bishops of England, Scotland and Wales. The Oscott visit was the last scheduled event during the four-day 2010 State Visit of Benedict to the UK. The Pope would later depart the UK from Birmingham Airport.

Choral music
A CD of choral music, performed by The Schola and recorded live in the college's chapel on 7 June 2008, was released by the college (cat. no. OSCOTTCD01).

Notable alumni

Clergy

Bishops
Francis Amherst (1819–1883), Bishop of Northampton.
Tomás Bryan Livermore (1824–1902), Bishop of Cartagena
Edward Bagshawe (1829–1915), Bishop of Nottingham.
Terence Brain (1938–), Bishop of Salford.
Kevin Dunn (1950–2008), Bishop of Hexham and Newcastle.
William Lee (1875–1948), Bishop of Clifton.
Leo McCartie (1925–2020), Bishop of Northampton.
 David McGough (1944-), Auxiliary Bishop of Birmingham.
James McGuinness (1925–2007), Bishop of Nottingham.
Robert Willson (1794–1866), Bishop of Hobart.
 David Oakley (1955), Bishop of Northampton

Priests
William Francis Barry (1849–1930), writer.
Frederick Charles Husenbeth (1796–1872), writer.
Henry Weedall (1788–1859), educator.
William Purcell Witcutt (c.1910–c.1970), author.

Laity
John Dalberg-Acton, 1st Baron Acton (1834–1902).
George Ashlin (1837–1921), architect.
John Ball (1818–1889), Irish politician and naturalist.
Wilfrid Scawen Blunt (1840–1922), poet.
Thomas Henry Burke (1829–1882), Permanent Under Secretary at the Irish Office.
John Cornwell (1940–), writer.
Charles Kent (1823–1902), journalist and editor.
Edmund Kirby (1838–1920), architect.
Nicholas Lash (1934–2020), theologian.
Ernest Law (1854–1930), historian and barrister.
Edwin de Lisle MP (1852–1920), politician.
St. George Jackson Mivart (1827–1900), biologist.
George Moore (1852–1933), novelist.
Francis Loraine Petre (1852–1925), civil servant and military historian.
Thomas Nicholas Redington (1815–1862), Irish political administrator.
Frederick Rolfe, also known as Baron Corvo (1860–1913), writer and artist.
Joseph Stevenson (1806–1895), archivist and editor.
Gerald Strickland, 1st Baron Strickland (1861–1940), Prime Minister of Malta.

Former presidents and rectors

Presidents
1794–1808 John Bew
1808–15 Thomas Potts
1816–18 John Francis Quick
1818–25 Thomas Walsh
1825–40 Henry Weedall
1840–47 Nicholas Wiseman
1847–48 Henry F.C. Logan
1848–53 John Moore
1853–59 Henry Weedall
1859–60 George Morgan
1860–77 James Spencer Northcote
1877–80 John Hawksford
1880–84 Edward Acton
1885 Joseph Henry Souter

Rectors
1885–90 Joseph Henry Souter
1890–96 Edward Ilsley
1896–1924 Henry Parkinson
1924–29 Charles Cronin
1929–35 James Dey
1935–61 Leonard Emery
1961–68 Richard Foster
1968–79 Francis Thomas
1979–84 Patrick Kelly
1984–89 Michael Kirkham
1989–98 Patrick McKinney
1998–2001 Kevin McDonald
2001–13 Mark Crisp
2013–20 David Oakley
2020–21 Giles Goward
2021-Present: Fr Michael Dolman

Further reading
The Oscottian - Literary Gazette of St Mary's College, Oscott. Jubilee edition, 1888
Oscott College in the Twentieth Century, Michael E. Williams, 2001, Gracewing Publishing

References

External links
St Mary's College website
Catholic Encyclopedia article

Buildings and structures in Birmingham, West Midlands
Education in Birmingham, West Midlands
Oscott
Grade II* listed buildings in the West Midlands (county)
1794 establishments in England
Educational institutions established in 1794
Augustus Pugin buildings